FC Khimik Uvarovo was a Russian football team from Uvarovo. It played professionally in 1993 and 1994. Their best result was 14th place in Zone 3 of the Russian Second Division in 1993.

External links
  Team history at KLISF

Association football clubs established in 1992
Association football clubs disestablished in 1995
Defunct football clubs in Russia
Sport in Tambov Oblast
1992 establishments in Russia
1995 disestablishments in Russia